The homing endonucleases are a special type of restriction enzymes encoded by introns or inteins. They act on the cellular DNA of the cell that synthesizes them; to be precise, in the opposite allele of the gene that encode them.

Homing endonucleases
The list includes some of the most studied examples. The following concepts have been detailed:
 Enzyme: Accepted name of the molecule, according to the internationally adopted nomenclature. Bibliographical references. (Further reading: .)
 SF (structural family): Any of the established families for this kind of proteins, based in their shared structural motifs: H1: LAGLIDADG family – H2: GIY-YIG family – H3: H-N-H family – H4: His-Cys box family – H5: PD-(D/E)xK – H6: EDxHD. (Further reading: .)
 PDB code: Code used to identify the structure of a protein in the PDB database. If no structure is available, a UniProt identifier is given instead.
 Source: Organism that naturally produces the enzyme.
 D: Biological domain of the source: A: archaea – B: bacteria – E: eukarya.
 SCL: Subcellular genome: chloro: chloroplast – chrm: chromosomal – mito: mitochondrial – plasmid: other extrachromosomal – phage: bacteriophage.
 Recognition sequence: Sequence of DNA recognized by the enzyme. The enzyme is specifically bound to this sequence.
 Cut: Cutting site and products of the cut. Both the recognition sequence and the cutting site match usually, but sometimes the cutting site can be dozens of nucleotides away from the recognition site.

*: Nicking endonuclease: These enzymes cut only one DNA strand, leaving the other strand untouched.
**: Unknown cutting site: Researchers have not been able to determine the exact cutting site of these enzymes yet.

See also
 List of restriction enzyme cutting sites.
 Homing endonuclease.
 Restriction enzyme.
 Introns and inteins.
 Intragenomic conflict: Homing endonuclease genes.
  I-CreI homing endonuclease.
 Isoschizomer.
 Detailed articles about certain restriction enzymes: EcoRI, HindIII, BglII.

Information sources
Databases and lists of restriction enzymes:
 Very comprehensive database of restriction enzymes supported by New England Biolabs. It includes all kind of biological, structural, kinetical and commercial information about thousands of enzymes. Also includes related literature for every molecule: 
 Database of inteins, hosted by New England Biolabs. .
 Detailed information for biochemical experiments: 
 Alphabetical list of enzymes and their restriction sites: 
 General information about restriction sites and biochemical conditions for restriction reactions: 
Databases of proteins:
 Database of protein structures, solved at atomic resolution: 
 Databases of proteins:

Notes and references 

Biotechnology
Homing endonuclease cutting sites
Restriction enzymes